Beremiany is a village in Kolomyia Raion (district) of Ivano-Frankivsk Oblast (province) in western Ukraine. As part of the Kolomyia district since 1986. Beremiany belongs to Hvizdets settlement hromada, one of the hromadas of Ukraine.

Through the village runs road .

History 
For the first time in historical documents, as the name – Na Beremianach fields – mention 1788 in the "Akta grodzkie i ziemskie".

Nature 
There are 3 ponds.

Religion 
Believers – Ukrainian Orthodox Church of the Kyivan Patriarchate, there are two families of Jehovah's Witnesses.

There is Chapel of Saint Demetrius of Thessaloniki (1993).

Inhabitants 
Population in 1997: 143 inhabitants with over 46 houses.
Population in 2001: 119 inhabitants.

References

Notes

Sources
 Енциклопедія Коломийщини, V. 2, letter Б.
 Бучко Д. Походження назв населених пунктів Покуття, Lviv: Svit, 1990, S. 52.

External links
 Beremiany

Villages in Kolomyia Raion